Carlos Mercenario Carbajal (born May 23, 1967) is a Mexican retired race walker. He was born in Mexico City, Distrito Federal. He is the 1992 Olympic Silver Medalist in the 50 K walk and a three-time World Race Walking Cup champion.

Personal bests
20 km: 1:19:24 hrs –  New York City, 3 May 1987
50 km: 3:42:03 hrs –  San Jose, California, 2 June 1991

Achievements

References

External links

1967 births
Living people
Mexican male racewalkers
Athletes (track and field) at the 1988 Summer Olympics
Athletes (track and field) at the 1992 Summer Olympics
Olympic athletes of Mexico
Olympic silver medalists for Mexico
World record setters in athletics (track and field)
Athletes from Mexico City
Athletes (track and field) at the 1987 Pan American Games
Athletes (track and field) at the 1991 Pan American Games
Athletes (track and field) at the 1995 Pan American Games
Athletes (track and field) at the 1999 Pan American Games
Olympic silver medalists in athletics (track and field)
Pan American Games medalists in athletics (track and field)
Pan American Games gold medalists for Mexico
Pan American Games silver medalists for Mexico
World Athletics Race Walking Team Championships winners
Medalists at the 1992 Summer Olympics
Medalists at the 1987 Pan American Games
Medalists at the 1991 Pan American Games
Medalists at the 1995 Pan American Games
Medalists at the 1999 Pan American Games
Central American and Caribbean Games medalists in athletics
20th-century Mexican people